Royal Guard Of Oman Technical College and commonly known as RGOTC, is a public and military/Technical college in al Seeb on the governorate of Muscat at the Sultanate of Oman, owned by the Royal Guard of Oman and founded by Sultan Qaboos Al Saeed in order to improve technical and vocational education in the country.

History
In 1976 His Majesty Sultan Qaboos bin Said established the first Technical School in Oman. It was established under the aegis of the Royal Guard of Oman with the aim of providing a first class Technical Education for Omani boys from an early age. In the first few years of operation, only the top students from the various regions of Oman were selected and priority was given to siblings of Royal Guard personnel. A few years later, the school's remit was changed to that of a Technical College. Subsequently, access was widened to incorporate a wider range of students from all regions and sectors in Omani society and all prospective students were required to sit an entrance test. Based on the results of the entrance test, a final selection of first year students was made. Over the past three decades the intake of students has gradually increased from the initial twenty students to fifty students per year.

certifications
The Royal Guard of Oman Technical College offers many certificates to its students. IGCSE certificates are being studied for from the eighth grade and are tested on it on the tenth grade. BTEC mechatronics certificates are also offered from eleventh to twelfth grade. IELTS are taken at twelfth grade too.

See also 
 List of schools in Oman
 List of universities in Oman

References

External links
 Royal Court of Affairs

Seeb
Organizations based in Oman with royal patronage
Schools in Oman
Colleges in Oman
Military academies
Educational institutions established in 1976
1976 establishments in Oman